Dimitri Tadić was a Yugoslav football manager who coached the national teams of both Kuwait and the United Arab Emirates. While coaching UAE at the 1976 Gulf Cup, Tadić suffered a heart attack and was replaced by local coach Jumaa Ghareeb. The team did not win any of their games in the competition.

References

Year of birth missing
Possibly living people
Yugoslav football managers
Serbian expatriate football managers
Kuwait national football team managers
Serbian expatriate sportspeople in Kuwait
Expatriate football managers in Kuwait
United Arab Emirates national football team managers
Serbian expatriate sportspeople in the United Arab Emirates
Expatriate football managers in the United Arab Emirates